Brighton Secondary College is a year 7 to 12 co-educational public secondary school, located in the City of Bayside, Brighton East, Victoria, Australia. The college was established in 1955, where until 1988, it was known as Brighton High School. More than 1200 pupils are enrolled at the school.

Grounds and facilities
The college provides a gymnasium, library, canteen, school hall as well as drama and music facilities. The school has an Arts and Materials Section, a Science Wing, VCE and Study Centre.

The main part of the school consists of the North and Central wings. The North corridor houses the bulk of general school classrooms, but are used particularly for year 7s. The Central Corridor houses a computer laboratory, staff rooms, and storage and building services like the heater boilers. A portion of the Central corridor was destroyed during a fire in April 2000, previously extending to where the Discovery Centre now stands.

It is expected the Northern and Central corridors are to be demolished during 2016 due to their apparent age, and to make room for a new building, which will connect to the East wing.

The new East Corridor (completed in 2014) consists of two floors. The bottom floor holds the Science and Art departments and classrooms, where as the upper floor contains General VCE classrooms and numerous study centres. The most northern part of the East wing (completed in 2009) consists of the senior school offices and an I.T assistance department.

To the south of the library are located the portable classrooms 'P1' to 'P8', yet the area has now been complemented with a temporary hall for lockers. To the east of which, is the Discovery Centre which is used predominantly by year 9s.

The furthest south classrooms, S7/S8, have been untouched since 2013, due to the newer arts department in the E wing being used. For a few occasions, they have been used for playing table tennis, but were previously the only art classrooms in the school. These room along with most of the other S classrooms, the N corridor, and the C corridor are areas of dire need for either complete demolition or replacement.

Attached to the western end of the N-wing is the Hall, on the upper level. On the lower level are the rooms for drama, band, music instruction and practice. Adjacent and to the south is the canteen area, toilet blocks, and the main entrance to the gym.

To the west are the rooms for Visual Communication & Design and Media, but mainly used for general senior subjects –  dubbed the West Wing. The area formerly housed Vocational Curriculum and Learning (VCAL) students, the house/block better known as Gumnut Cottage which featured in the television series 'Summer Heights High' before being demolished in late 2007.

The completion of the Discovery Centre was a massive undertaking, but was successful due to donations from students, former students as well as grants from the government. The Eastern Wing, and certain sections of the school grounds are in urgent need of upgrading. The new and modern VCE Centre was opened in 2009. This centre extends now into the new Science, Arts and Technology 'da Vinci Centre' which was opened in 2014.

Staff

Headmasters
1955 – 1957 C.O. Holland
1958 – 1964 G.M. Stirling

Principals
1965 – 1965 G.M. Stirling
1965 – 1969 Leonard Albert Cooke (also, President of the Victorian High Schools Principals Association 1968 – 1989, Foundation President of the Australian High Schools Principals Association, 1969).
1970 – 1975 M. Brennan
1976 – 1981 G.E.P. Rowney
1982 – 1984 P.A. O'Brien
1985 – 1992 John Fowler
1992 – 1993 Phil Shireffs (Acting)
1994 – 1996 Phil Shireffs
1996 – 2015 Julie Podbury
2015 – Present Richard Minack

International Student Programme
The college has a programme for international students, attracting students from countries such as China, Japan, Indonesia, Thailand, Korea and Taiwan.

Brighton Secondary College has a sister school in Japan – Tokoname Kita. Every second year the schools alternate in visiting each other with a large group of students and a few teachers who stay at the sister school. Housing is provided by the families at each of the two schools.

Student Representative Council
The student body is represented by a Student Representative Council (SRC) where four students are drawn from each year level, gender balanced at teachers' discretion and voted by peers. The SRC serve to represent their year level and the general school body in the upper hierarchy (School Council/Principal/Teachers) in school. They run casual clothes days, special events and fund-raising for the student community or social justice issues.

SEAL Program
Brighton Secondary College offers a Select Entry Accelerated Learning program. The college is an approved Department of Education "Select Entry Acceleration Provider" to the Bayside Network. The first set started in 1999, whilst later years have the option of finishing school one year early. SEAL's who decide not to leave a year earlier have the opportunity to do a 3rd year of VCE, therefore allowing them to try/do more electives.

When vacancies open up due to SEAL students leaving BSC (quite often to Melbourne High School/ MacRobertson Girls High School) the school puts these spare positions up for grabs; a small percentage of the mainstream students (other school's students can also apply) are chosen, based on grades to sit an entrance test; consisting of Maths, English and Science. The students who score the highest are then accepted into the program.

Year 7 SEAL start with an altered curriculum to normal Year 7 studies. It integrates an amount of work usually intended for Year 8. Year 9 SEAL are identified as Year 10s, so as Year 10 SEAL identified as Year 11 etc.

Houses
Brighton SC has student houses, each is named in honour of a ship captain. Each house is headed by a teacher, A House Captain, House Vice Captain, Junior House Captain and a Junior House Vice Captain. For Chorals a 'Cultural' captain is nominated to head each house as a conductor for the Chorals competition.

Students are split into four houses, also represented by a colour:
 Lonsdale (yellow)
 Murray (red) 
 Phillip (green)
 Grant (purple)
The houses were then updated in 2021 to be more modern in today's climate and changed to the following:

 Brennan (yellow)
 Mabo (red)
 Goldestein (green)
 Kirby (purple)

Throughout the year there are key events such as: 
Chorals – House choir event
Swimming – House swimming competition
Athletics – House athletics competition
Cross Country

Other competitions more at a school level that students participate in include Tournament of Minds, and Debating

Chorals
Chorals is one of the first key college events in the year. In its 50th year in 2011, Grant house were declared the winners.

Chorals is a house singing competition where each house forms their own choir from any number of students. Through a period of half a term, each house practises their repertoire of songs. On the main evening houses present these songs. Each house is required to sing a 'set song.' All houses sing this song, and the house then elects to sing two other songs decided by their Cultural Captain. The house that wins is  decided by an adjudicator, usually from a professional background outside the school.

The other part of the evening are soloist performances. Each house chooses a representative for the house soloist competition. Over the past few years, the main theme for soloists are songs from 'musicals.' They are judged not only on their singing ability, but also the portrayal of their character.

As well as the House Chorals Award, and Soloist Award, there is an award for the Best House Conductor, or "The Golden Hands Award". As well as the house, and solo singing, staff are invited to perform a piece. In the past, further performances were done by the 'Special Choir' – which in the past involved a smaller choir, performing a set of songs based on a particular theme, often highlighting the spread of talent in the college. In more recent years, the concert band and piano solos have been arranged.

Music
The college offers instrumental music lessons. Brighton SC is also home to local youth bands.

The school has a concert band and a stage band. The concert band usually plays on chorals and presentation evening. Both bands usually contain a variety of instruments forming woodwind, brass and rhythm sections.

The Kool Skool's program allows students from Brighton SC to fully develop their music talents. They are offered a recording studio, and a chance to professionally publish their music with Kool Skool's annually.

Television
In 2006/2007 (filming concluded on 2 February 2007) Brighton Secondary College became the set for Chris Lilley's new show Summer Heights High which premiered on the ABC on Wednesday 5 September 2007. Students starred as extras in the show.

On Monday 24 April 2006, XYZ Studios filmed a music video at Brighton Secondary College. The song "Hold On" by hip hop artist Phrase was a collaboration between Universal Music and XYZ Studios.

Controversies

On October 24, 2008, staff and students were evacuated from the school grounds in the morning after a suspicious home made device was spotted on school property during muck up day activities from Year 12 students. 

In 2014 a former staff member was convicted after stealing around $40,000 from the school. The employee had used a corporate credit card and stolen funds from the school's canteen to support a drug addiction.

In 2019, while addressing a school assembly over the Christchurch attacks, principal Richard Minack used racial slurs. Minack described his reasoning for slurs as “I hope you understand that I used it to call out and criticise racism and bigotry,”

In 2020, female Year 7 students were forced by staff to line up and kneel for uniform checks at the outrage of parents.

Antisemitic bullying allegations
A former student of Brighton Secondary College alleged in 2020 that after joining the college in 2013, he began to face verbal antisemitic bullying. The student stated bullying became physical during the second year. "I notified the school 10 times within two weeks regarding the many instances of antisemitic name-calling and physical abuse, including hitting and punching. But still, no action was taken"; the student stated. He also alleged that he was shoved into toilets, then threatened with a knife to remain silent and not fight back, and that his  complaints were not investigated by the college authorities. In a joint letter to Daniel Andrews, Premier of Victoria, MPs David Southwick and James Newbury demanded to ensure investigation; and stated: 

More allegations of antisemitic bullying were made in July and August 2020. In 2022, five former students initiated a lawsuit against the school, its principal Richard Minack, and two former teachers, on the grounds that they were "subjected to years of antisemitic bullying, discrimination and negligence". The suit alleged that Minack had "referred to Jews as subhuman, evil, the N-word", and that students had been forbidden to wear religious symbols.

See also
 List of schools in Victoria
 List of high schools in Victoria

References

External links

Official website

Rock Eisteddfod Challenge participants
Educational institutions established in 1955
Public high schools in Melbourne
1955 establishments in Australia
Buildings and structures in the City of Bayside